The 1989 Big East baseball tournament was held at Muzzy Field in Bristol, Connecticut. As a result, Villanova earned the Big East Conference's automatic bid to the 1989 NCAA Division I baseball tournament. This was the Wildcat's first tournament championship.

Format and seeding 
The 1989 Big East baseball tournament was a 4 team double elimination tournament. The top two teams from each division, based on conference winning percentage only, earned berths in the tournament. Each division winner played the opposite division's runner up in the first round. Connecticut earned the second seed from the North by winning the season series against Boston College.

Tournament 

* - Indicates game required 11 innings.

All-Tournament Team 
The following players were named to the All-Tournament team.

Jack Kaiser Award 
Rafael Novoa was the winner of the 1989 Jack Kaiser Award. Novoa was a pitcher for Villanova.

References 

Tournament
Big East Conference Baseball Tournament
Big East Conference baseball tournament
Big East Conference baseball tournament
College baseball tournaments in Connecticut
Bristol, Connecticut
Sports competitions in Hartford County, Connecticut